Somdet Phra Ariyavangsagatayana Somdet Phra Sangharaja, or simply known as Ariyavangsagatayana VII, was briefly the 17th Supreme Patriarch of Thailand (1972–1973, 2515–2516 Thai calendar). He was born in 1896 as Pun Punnasiri in Song Phi Nong District, Suphan Buri Province. He was a member of the Chetupon Temple. He reigned only for 1 year and 4 months. His predecessor was Ariyavangsagatayana, 16th Supreme Patriarch of Thailand and his successor was Jinavajiralongkorn (Vasana Vasano).

Somdejphrasangkharach XVII Hospital, the main hospital of Song Phi Nong District, is named after his title.

External links
 Photo of the patriarch

Buddhism in Thailand
1896 births
1974 deaths
People from Suphan Buri province
Thai Theravada Buddhist monks
Supreme Patriarchs of Thailand
20th-century Buddhist monks